Jay Mathews is an author and education columnist with the Washington Post.

Career
Mathews has worked at the Washington Post writing news reports and books about China, disability rights, the stock market, and education. He writes the Class Struggle blog for the Washington Post.

He has prepared the annual ranking of "America’s Most Challenging High Schools" for the Washington Post (and previously for Newsweek) for 18 years. He developed the "challenge index" by counting how many individuals take Advanced Placement, International Baccalaureate, and Advanced International Certificate of Education tests at a school each year, divided by the number of graduating seniors.
  Top-performing schools are excluded. 

He previously held Bureau Chief posts at locations including Beijing, as its first Bureau Chief in 1979-1980, and Los Angeles. He spent several weeks back in Beijing in 1989 to cover the Tiananmen protests at the time, and has since challenged the dominant media narrative of a student massacre inside Tiananmen Square, reporting that bloody scenes only took place outside the Square, and not only involving students.

Bibliography

References

External links
Class Struggle online column
Waiting For Superman Debate

American columnists
1945 births
Living people
Writers from Long Beach, California
Occidental College alumni
Harvard College alumni
The Washington Post people
United States Army personnel of the Vietnam War